George Cooper Grizzard Jr. (April 1, 1928 – October 2, 2007) was an American stage, television, and film actor.  He was the recipient of a Grammy Award, a Primetime Emmy Award and a Tony Award, among other accolades.

Life and career

Grizzard was born in Roanoke Rapids, North Carolina, the son of Mary Winifred (née Albritton) and George Cooper Grizzard, an accountant.

Grizzard was raised in Washington, DC, and attended the University of North Carolina at Chapel Hill, returning to Washington after graduation to work in advertising. He began his acting career at Washington's Arena Stage.

Grizzard memorably appeared as an unscrupulous United States Senator in the film Advise and Consent in 1962. His other theatrical films included the drama From the Terrace with Paul Newman (1960), the Western story Comes a Horseman with Jane Fonda (1978), and a Neil Simon comedy, Seems Like Old Times (1980).

Grizzard made his Broadway debut in The Desperate Hours in 1955. He was a frequent interpreter of the plays of Edward Albee, having appeared in the original 1962 production of Who's Afraid of Virginia Woolf? as Nick, which won him a Grammy Award for Best Spoken Word Album along with his castmates. He also appeared in the 1996 revival of A Delicate Balance and the 2005 revival of Seascape. He also starred in You Know I Can't Hear You When the Water's Running. He won the 1996 Tony Award for Best Actor in a Play for A Delicate Balance. Additional Broadway credits include The Creation of the World and Other Business, The Glass Menagerie, The Country Girl, The Royal Family, and California Suite.

Grizzard guest-starred several times during the 1990s on the NBC television drama Law & Order as defense attorney Arthur Gold. He also portrayed President John Adams in the Emmy Award-winning WNET-produced PBS miniseries The Adams Chronicles. In 1980, he won an Emmy for his work in The Oldest Living Graduate.  He starred as reporter Richard Larsen in The Deliberate Stranger, a television movie about serial killer Ted Bundy.

He was inducted into the American Theater Hall of Fame in 2002.

Death
Grizzard died in Manhattan of complications from lung cancer. According to his New York Times obituary, his only survivor was his long-time companion William Tynan. Grizzard had kept his homosexuality private during his life.

Filmography

Film

Television

References

External links

 
 
 
 
 George Grizzard papers, circa 1900-2007, held by the Billy Rose Theatre Division, New York Public Library for the Performing Arts

1928 births
2007 deaths
Male actors from North Carolina
American male film actors
American male stage actors
American male television actors
Audiobook narrators
Outstanding Performance by a Supporting Actor in a Miniseries or Movie Primetime Emmy Award winners
American gay actors
Grammy Award winners
LGBT people from North Carolina
Tony Award winners
Deaths from lung cancer in New York (state)
20th-century American male actors
21st-century American male actors
People from Manhattan
People from Roanoke Rapids, North Carolina
20th-century American LGBT people